Calcium/calmodulin dependent protein kinase IG is a protein that in humans is encoded by the CAMK1G gene.

Function

This gene encodes a protein similar to calcium/calmodulin dependent protein kinase, however, its exact function is not known. [provided by RefSeq, Jul 2008].

References

Further reading